Mar Athanasios College for Advanced Studies Tiruvalla (MACFAST) is a premiere research institute in Pathanamthitta,Kerala, India established in 2001. The college offers specially designed courses in business management, information technology and bio sciences.

Top MBA College in Kerala Providing Quality education and placements support.

History
MACFAST is owned and managed by the Corporate Educational Agency of the Catholic Archdiocese of Tiruvalla. The president is Thomas Mar Koorilos. It is located in the town of Tiruvalla, Kerala. As part of its mission to prepare students to meet the demands of the corporate and scientific world, the institute has established the MACFAST Centre for Research and Development (MCRD), offering Ph.D. programmes in the biosciences.

A research journal, Journal of Science, Technology and Management (JSTM), has been published since 2008. MACFAST owns an on-campus Community Radio Station. Radio MACFAST 90.4 is the first on-campus community radio in Kerala.

MACFAST Industry Interface (MII) was established in 2010.

In 2011, the college was declared as having the State's largest solar powered campus, by the Kerala Electricity Minister Aryadan Mohammed. The system contains 27,600 Watts panels, 30 kW bi-directional charger which functions as an inverter with grid-tie capability. The system also has a four-member charge controller, a 19-inch rack and a central monitoring device package.

The UNAI (United Nations Academic Impact) and the UNHATE Foundation have selected an institution each from 10 countries for implementing the project aimed at facilitating secondary and tertiary education for indigenous women in the year 2015. MACFAST was the only B-School selected from India for implementing this program during that year. MACFAST in association with the  UNAI and the UNHATE Foundation, is providing educational support and guidance to 20 girls from remote villages in Kerala to realise their ambitions of higher education.

In recognition of its excellence in the curricular as well as co-curricular activities, innovative approaches in research and development, infrastructure facility and its social commitment, in 2016, MACFAST was accredited with  ‘A’ Grade by the National Assessment and Accreditation Council (NAAC), the autonomous body funded by University Grants Commission of Government of India that assesses and accredits higher education Institutions (HEIs) in India. Also the college has been enlisted among the ranking band of 151 - 200 of NIRF Ranking - 2020.

References

External links
MACFAST website

Research institutes in Kerala
Syro-Malankara Catholic Church
Catholic universities and colleges in India
Thiruvalla
Colleges affiliated to Mahatma Gandhi University, Kerala
Research institutes established in 2001
2001 establishments in Kerala